Vaivasvata Manu, also referred to as Shraddhadeva and Satyavrata, is the current Manu—the progenitor of the human race—in Hindu mythology. He is the seventh of the 14 Manus of the current kalpa (aeon) of Hindu cosmology.

He is the son of Vivasvana (also known as Surya), the Sun god, and his wife Saranyu.  Forewarned about the divine flood by the Matsya avatara of the god Vishnu, Manu saved mankind by building a boat that carried his family and the Saptarishi to safety.

Ancestry 
According to the Puranas, the genealogy of Shraddhadeva is as follows:

 Brahma
 Marichi, one of the 10 Prajapatis created by Brahma.
 Kashyapa, son of Marichi and his thirteen wives, among which Kala is prominent. Kashyapa is regarded as one of the progenitors of humanity.
 Vivasvan or Surya, son of Kashyapa and Aditi.
 Vaivasvata Manu, because he is the son of Vivasvan and Saranyu (Saṃjñā). He is also known as Satyavrata and Shraddhadeva.

Legend
Shraddhadeva is stated to be the king of the Dravida Kingdom during the epoch of the Matsya Purana. According to the Matsya Purana, Matsya, the avatara of Vishnu, first appeared as a shaphari (a small carp) to Shraddhadeva while he washed his hands in a river flowing down the Malaya Mountains.

The little fish asked the king to save him, and out of compassion, he put it in a water jar. It kept growing bigger and bigger, until the king first put it in a bigger pitcher, and then deposited it in a well. When the well also proved insufficient for the ever-growing fish, the king placed it in a tank (reservoir), that was two yojanas (16 miles) in height above the surface and on land, as much in length, and a yojana (8 miles) in breadth. As it grew further, the king had to put the fish in a river, and when even the river proved insufficient, he placed it in the ocean, after which it nearly filled the vast expanse of the great ocean.

It was then that Vishnu, revealing himself, informed the king of an all-destructive deluge which would be coming very soon. The king built a huge boat which housed his family, saptarishi, nine types of seeds, and animals to repopulate the earth, after the deluge would end and the oceans and seas would recede. At the time of deluge, Vishnu appeared as a horned fish and Shesha appeared as a rope, with which the king fastened the boat to the horn of the fish.

The boat was perched after the deluge on the top of the highest peak of Himavat called Naubandhana. After the deluge, Manu's family and the seven sages repopulated the earth. According to Purana, Manu's story occur before 28 chaturyuga in the present Manvantara which is the 7th Manvantara. This amounts to 120 million years ago.

This narrative is similar to other flood myths like the Gilgamesh flood myth and the Genesis flood narrative.

Descendants 
Shraddhadeva married Shraddha and had ten children including Ila and Ikshvaku, the progenitors of the Lunar and Solar dynasties, respectively.

The Mahabharata states:

Theosophy

In Theosophy, the "Vaivasvata Manu" is one of the most important beings at the highest level of Initiation of the ancient Vedic sages, along with Maitreya, and the Maha Chohan. According to Theosophy, each root race has its own Manu who physically incarnates in an advanced body of an individual of the old root race and physically progenerates with a suitable female partner the first individuals of the new root race.

References

Citations

Sources
 

Characters in Hindu mythology
Legendary progenitors